Cydnus aterrimus is a species of burrowing bug in the family Cydnidae. It is found in the Caribbean, Europe and Northern Asia (excluding China), North America, and Southern Asia.

References

Further reading

External links

 

Cydnidae
Articles created by Qbugbot
Insects described in 1771